A volcano tectonic earthquake is caused by the movement of magma beneath the surface of the Earth. The movement results in pressure changes where the rock around the magma has experienced stress. At some point, this stress can cause the rock to break or move. This seismic activity is used by scientists to monitor volcanoes. The earthquakes may also be related to dike intrusion or occur as earthquake swarms.

Cause of volcano tectonic earthquakes 

One possible scenario resulting in a possible volcano tectonic earthquake is tectonic subduction zones. The compression of plates at these subduction zones forces the magma beneath them to move. Magma can not move through the newly compressed crust in as easily a manner. This means it tends to pool in magma chambers beneath the surface and between the converging tectonic plates. Many of the famous and most well known  volcanoes fall on this line, including the Ring of Fire.  As the plates move, magma underground may be forced in and out of these chambers. This movement is capable of causing the unstable earth around it to cave in or shift. The movement of this magma as described causes measurable seismic activity. This is separate from earthquakes directly related to faults.

Scientists monitoring volcanoes have noticed that magma movement may lead to earthquake swarms depending on the movement of magma and the interaction with rock beneath the ground. Additionally, the volatility of volcanoes and the accompanying earthquakes has been shown to be linked to dike induced stress and the interaction this causes between the magma, rock, and wall of the chamber.

Importance 

Volcano tectonic seismicity is an important tool in being able to predict the eruptions of volcanoes. Seismic activity occurs as a precursor to most large eruptions. We can use tectonic events to predict eruptions in long-dormant volcanoes. Some notable examples of eruptions preceded by volcano tectonic earthquakes include ones at Nevado del Ruiz (1985), Pinatubo (1991), Unzen (1990), and Cotopaxi (2002). Quakes with volcano-tectonic characteristics accompany magmatic intrusions in near real time.

Use in monitoring volcanoes 

Nearly every recorded volcanic eruption has been preceded by some form of earthquake activity beneath or near the volcano. Due to the relation between magma movement, earthquakes, and possible eruptions, approximately 200 of the world's volcanoes are seismically monitored. The recording of several years of background seismic data has allowed for classification of volcanic earthquakes. These earthquakes tend to occur in swarms as opposed to mainshock–aftershock sequences, have smaller maximum sizes than tectonic structure earthquakes, have similar waveform patterns, increase in number before eruptions, and occur near or beneath the site of the eruption.

Other types of seismic activity monitored in relation to volcanoes and their eruptions are long period seismic waves, which are caused by sudden sporadic movement of magma that had previously not been moving due to a blockage, and harmonic tremor, which indicates steady magma movement deep in the mantle.

References

Volcanism
Seismology